The Horniman Museum and Gardens is a museum in Forest Hill, London, England. Commissioned in 1898, it opened in 1901 and was designed by Charles Harrison Townsend in the Modern Style. It has displays of anthropology, natural history and musical instruments, and is known for its large collection of taxidermied animals. The building is Grade II* listed.

It is a non-departmental public body of the Department for Digital, Culture, Media and Sport and is constituted as a company and registered charity under English law. In 2022 the museum won Museum of the Year, an award made by the Art Fund.

History 
The museum was founded in 1901 by Frederick John Horniman. Frederick had inherited his father's Horniman's Tea business, which by 1891 had become the world's biggest tea trading business.

The proceeds from the business allowed Horniman to indulge his lifelong passion for collecting, and which after travelling extensively had some 30,000 items in his various collections, covering natural history, cultural artefacts and musical instruments.

In 1911, an additional building to the west of the main building, originally containing a lecture hall and library, was donated by Frederick Horniman's son Emslie Horniman. This was also designed by Townsend. A new extension, opened in 2002, was designed by Allies and Morrison.

The museum won the Art Fund's Museum of the Year award in 2022. In November 2022, the museum returned a collection of 72 items that were stolen from the Kingdom of Benin, including Benin Bronzes, to Nigeria's National Commission for Museums and Monuments.

Collections
The Horniman specialises in anthropology, natural history and musical instruments and has a collection of 350,000 objects. The ethnography and music collections have Designated status. One of its most famous exhibits is the large collection of stuffed animals. It also has an aquarium noted for its .

The Horniman housed some of the Benin Bronzes until 28 November 2022, when they were signed back unconditionally to Nigeria, from where the pieces were looted in 1897 by British troops.

Floor directory

Transport connections

Gardens

 A Grade II listed conservatory from 1894 which was moved from Hornimans' family house in Croydon to the present site in the 1980s.
 A bandstand from 1912
 An enclosure for small animals
 A Butterfly House
 A nature trail
 An ornamental garden
 Plants for materials, medicines, and foods and dyes 
 A sound garden with large musical instruments for playing
 A new building, the Pavilion, for working on materials that are outside of the collections, such as from the gardens.
The gardens are also Grade II listed on the Register of Historic Parks and Gardens of Special Historic Interest in England.

Mosaic

On the London Road wall of the main building is a neoclassical mosaic mural entitled Humanity in the House of Circumstance, designed by Robert Anning Bell and assembled by a group of young women over the course of 210 days. Composed of more than 117,000 individual tesserae, it measures  and symbolises personal aspirations and limitations.

The three figures on the far left represent Art, Poetry and Music, standing by a doorway symbolising birth, while the armed figure represents Endurance. The two kneeling figures represent Love and Hope, while the central figure symbolises Humanity. Charity stands to the right bearing figs and wine, followed by white-haired Wisdom holding a staff, and a seated figure representing Meditation.  Finally, a figure symbolising Resignation stands by the right-hand doorway, which represents death.

Totem pole

A  totem pole, carved from red cedar, stands outside the museum's main entrance. It was carved in 1985 as part of the American Arts Festival by Nathan Jackson, a Tlingit native Alaskan. The carvings on the pole depict figures from Alaskan legend of a girl who married a bear, with an eagle (Jackson's clan crest) at the top. The pole is one of only a handful of totem poles in the United Kingdom, others being on display at the British Museum, the National Museum of Scotland in Edinburgh, Windsor Great Park, Bushy Park, the Yorkshire Sculpture Park, the Pitt Rivers Museum at Oxford, and at Alsford's Wharf in Berkhamsted.
There is also a totem pole in the Royal Albert Memorial Museum in Exeter. It is displayed in their World Cultures galleries.

CUE building
The Horniman Museum contains the CUE (Centre for Understanding the Environment) building. This opened in 1996 and was designed by local architects Archetype using methods developed by Walter Segal. The building has a grass roof and was constructed from sustainable materials. It also incorporates passive ventilation.

Gallery

See also 
 List of music museums

References

External links

Forest Hill image gallery
urban75 photo feature
Review and Visitor Information for the Horniman Museum
The Horniman Museum on Museums London directory of museums in London

Grade II listed parks and gardens in London
Parks and open spaces in the London Borough of Lewisham
Museums sponsored by the Department for Digital, Culture, Media and Sport
Natural history museums in London
Charities based in London
Musical instrument museums in England
Anthropology museums
Asian art museums in the United Kingdom
Music museums in London
Museums in the London Borough of Lewisham
Museums established in 1901
Buildings and structures completed in 1901
Grade II* listed buildings in the London Borough of Lewisham
Grade II* listed museum buildings
Arts and Crafts architecture in England
Art Nouveau architecture in London
Art Nouveau museum buildings
Museums established in 1911
Organisations based in the London Borough of Lewisham